Munira Yasin Abdullahi is an American politician who is the representative for Ohio House District 9. She won the primary on August 2, 2022 and ran unopposed in the November 2022 general election. She and Rep. Ismail Mohammed are the first two Somali American representatives in Ohio. She is also the first Muslim woman to serve in the state house.

Abdullahi's family left Somalia when she was three years old. They moved to an apartment in the Northside neighborhood of Columbus, Ohio. She has type 1 diabetes. Abdullahi graduated from Columbus Alternative High School and completed a bachelor's degree in political science at the Ohio State University.

References

External links

Living people
Year of birth missing (living people)
American politicians of Somalian descent
21st-century African-American politicians
21st-century American politicians
Politicians from Columbus, Ohio
Ohio State University alumni
Ohio Democrats
African-American Muslims
People with type 1 diabetes